Godumops is a monotypic genus of Papuan wall spiders containing the single species, Godumops caritus. It was first described by S. C. Crews & Mark Stephen Harvey in 2011, and is found in Papua New Guinea.

See also
 List of Selenopidae species

References

Endemic fauna of Papua New Guinea
Monotypic Araneomorphae genera
Selenopidae
Spiders of Oceania